Mona Lisa's Revenge is the fifth serial of the third series of the British science fiction television series The Sarah Jane Adventures. It first aired in two parts on CBBC on 12 and 13 November 2009.

Plot
Luke enters Clyde's painting for a competition and Clyde wins first prize. The prize is a trip for Clyde and his class to see the first showing of Leonardo da Vinci's Mona Lisa in Britain. Due to her proximity to her "brother", a painting known as the Abomination that was painted with the same kind of sentient paint in the same neighbourhood, Mona Lisa comes to life and steps out of her frame. She asks the curator Lionel Harding to find the Abomination, which is locked away in a box in the gallery's basement. Seeing the coverage of the supposed theft of the painting on television, Sarah Jane arrives at the gallery, encounters Mona Lisa and insists she release those transferred into paintings. Instead, Sarah Jane herself is trapped in a painting.

The key to the box is a puzzle box located in the gallery. Despite his admiration for Mona Lisa, Lionel destroys the key to prevent her from unleashing the beast on the world. Luke has Clyde draw a recreation of the key, which is in the same sketchbook as a sketch of K9. Mona Lisa brings the key into reality and opens the crate containing the Abomination. Before the Abomination can escape, K9 also comes to life and fires at the beast, causing it to retreat into the vault. Mona Lisa reverts to being a painting in a picture frame, and Sarah Jane and the others trapped in paintings are released.

Novelisation

Pearson Education published a simplified novelisation of this episode by Trevor Baxendale under the title Painting Peril for school literacy programs in September 2010.

References

External links

The Sarah Jane Adventures episodes
2009 British television episodes
Mona Lisa